Katrin Krüger (later Mietzner, born 10 April 1959 in Groß Schönebeck, Bezirk Frankfurt) is a former East German handball player who competed in the 1980 Summer Olympics.

In 1980 she won the bronze medal with the East German team. She played all five matches and scored eleven goals.

References

External links
 profile

1959 births
Living people
People from Barnim
People from Bezirk Frankfurt
German female handball players
Sportspeople from Brandenburg
Olympic handball players of East Germany
Handball players at the 1980 Summer Olympics
Olympic bronze medalists for East Germany
Olympic medalists in handball
Medalists at the 1980 Summer Olympics
Recipients of the Patriotic Order of Merit in silver
20th-century German women